was a feudal domain under the Tokugawa shogunate of Edo period Japan.  It is located in Echigo Province, Honshū. The domain was centered at Itoigawa Jin'ya, located in what is now part of the city of Itoigawa in Niigata Prefecture.

History
Itoigawa was initially an outlying portion of Takada Domain under the control of the Matsudaira clan following the establishment of the Tokugawa shogunate. It was separated from Takeda Domain following an O-Ie Sōdō. 

In 1692, Arima Kiyozumi was transferred (i.e. demoted) from Nobeoka Domain to Itoigawa due to mismanagement of his domains which resulted in a peasant revolt. This marked the start of Itoigawa Domain. He has transferred in 1695 to Maruoka Domain and the territory reverted to tenryō status.

Itoigawa Domain was created again in 1699, this time as a 10,000 koku holding for Honda Tsukeyoshi, who had been elevated from hatamoto status. He was transferred to Iiyama Domain in 1717.

The domain was then given to Matsudaira Naoyuki, grandson of Matsudaira Mitsumichi through his son Matsukata Naokata of the Echizen-Matsudaira line. His descendants ruled until the Meiji restoration. Despite the domain's location on the "Shio-no-michi", or main highway connecting the Hokuriku region with Edo and Kyoto, the domain was very small in kokudaka and suffered from numerous natural disasters, which meant that its finances were always in a crisis situation. A major uprising occurred in 1814. The sudden inflation of prices following the Perry Expedition and orders from the Tokugawa shogunate to construct coastal defence fortifications also created great unrest. The 7th daimyō of Itoigawa, Matsudaira Mochiaki became the 17th (and final) daimyō of Fukui Domain. The domain quickly sided with the Imperial forces in the Boshin War and was renamed  by the Meiji government. 

In July 1871, with the abolition of the han system, Itoigawa Domain briefly became Itoigawa Prefecture, and was merged into the newly created Niigata Prefecture. Under the new Meiji government, the final daimyō, Matsudaira Naoyasu was given the kazoku peerage title of shishaku (viscount).

Bakumatsu period holdings
As with most domains in the han system, Itoigawa Domain consisted of several discontinuous territories calculated to provide the assigned kokudaka, based on periodic cadastral surveys and projected agricultural yields.

Echigo Province
54 villages in Kubiki District
43 villages in Uonuma District

List of daimyō

Matsudaira Naoyuki 
 was the 1st Matsudaira daimyō of Itoigawa Domain in Echigo Province under the Edo period Tokugawa shogunate. Naoyuki born as the third son of Matsudaira Chikatoki of Hirose Domain in Izumo Province, and was adopted as heir to Matsudaira Naotomo of the Echizen-Matsudaira clan. His wife was Kame-hime, the daughter Matsudaira Naokata, the son of Matsudaira Mitsumichi. In 1705, he was received in formal audience by Shōgun Tokugawa Tsunayoshi and granted the courtesy title of Shinano-no-kami, which was changed a year later to Omi-no-kami. In 1717, he amassed the necessary kokudaka to qualify for the rank of daimyō and was appointed to the vacant seat of Itoigawa. However, he died the following year at the age of 36 without ever having visited his domain.

Matsudaira Naoyoshi 
 was the 2nd Matsudaira daimyō of Itoigawa. Naoyuki born to a hatamoto line of retainers, and was adopted as posthumous heir on the unexpectedly sudden death of Matsudaira Naoyuki. His wife was a daughter of Honda Tsukeyoshi, a former daimyō of Itoigawa who was now daimyō of Iiyama Domain. In 1726, he was appointed to the post of Osaka Kaban, and in 1727 to the post of bugyō overseeing the festivals at the Nikkō Tōshō-gū. These duties, together with a fire which destroyed to domain's main Edo residence in 1731 all but bankrupted the domain. He died in 1739 at the age of 39.

Matsudaira Katafusa 
 was the 3rd Matsudaira daimyō of Itoigawa. Katafusa was the fourth son of Naoyoshi, and became daimyō at the age of eight upon his father's sudden death. Domain affairs were handled by Matsudaira Naokata, who also oversaw his genpuku ceremony. In 1750, he was received in formal audience by Shōgun Tokugawa Ieshige. He subsequently served in numerous minor posts within the administration of the shogunate. his wife was a daughter of Wakabe Mizunabe of Ōmizo Domain. He died in 1773 at the age of 39.

Matsudaira Naotsugu 
 was the 4th Matsudaira daimyō of Itoigawa. Naotsugu was the seventh son of Katafusa, and became daimyō upon his father's sudden death in 1773. In 1776, he was received in formal audience by Shōgun Tokugawa Ieharu. He subsequently served in numerous minor posts within the administration of the shogunate, however, with each posting the financial drain on the domain became increasingly severe. He retired from public life in 1806 and died in 1814. His wife was a daughter of Honda Sukemitsu of Iiyama Domain.

Matsudaira Naomasu 
 was the 5th Matsudaira daimyō of Itoigawa. Naomasu was the eldest son of Naotsugu, and became daimyō upon his father's retirement in 1806. He subsequently served in numerous minor posts within the administration of the shogunate, however, with each posting the financial drain on the domain became increasingly severe. The financial problems of the domain were further compounded by a fire which destroyed the domain's main Edo residence in 1810, and another massive fire which destroyed the jōkamachi of Itoigawa in 1811. He was forced to borrow money at usurious rates from merchant houses, and to raise taxes to unsustainable levels, which resulted in a widespread revolt within the domain. He retired from public office in 1826 and died in 1833. His wife was the daughter of Matsudaira Naohiro of Akashi Domain; he later remarried to a daughter of Honda Masaharu of Tanaka Domain.

Matsudaira Naoharu 
 was the 6th Matsudaira daimyō of Itoigawa. Naoharu was the second son of Naomasu, and became daimyō upon his father's retirement in 1826. He subsequently served in numerous minor posts within the administration of the shogunate, including  bugyō overseeing the festivals at the Nikkō Tōshō-gū in 1833. In 1857, he retired in favour of his fourth son Matsudaira Naokiyo; however, Naokiyo was transferred to Fukui Domain the following year by the shogunate, and Matsudaira Naoyasu was sent from Akashi Domain to take his place. As he was still underage, Naoharu ruled the domain from behind-the-scenes until the Meiji restoration. In 1872, he relocated to Tokyo, where he died in 1878. His wife was a daughter of Satake Yoshichika of Iwasaki Domain.

Matsudaira Mochiaki 

  was the 7th Matsudaira daimyō of Itoigawa Domain and later the 17th (and final) daimyō  of Fukui Domain in Echizen Province. He ruled Itoigawa as  Matsudaira Naokiyo (直廉), but was transferred to Fukui Domain when Matsudaira Yoshinaga (better known as Matsudaira Shungaku was forced into retirement during the Ansei Purge.

Matsudaira Naoyasu 
 was the 8th (and final) Matsudaira daimyō of Itoigawa. Naoyasu was the seventh son of Matsudaira Naritsugu of Akashi Domain, and was selected to replace Matsudaira Mochiaki as daimyō after the latter was transferred to Fukui Domain. However, due to his youth, all power remained in the hands of his father-in-law, Matsudaira Naoharu, who ruled for behind-the-scenes. In 1868, the new Meiji government renamed Itoigawa Domain "Kiyosaki Domain" and from 1869 to the abolition of the han system in 1871 he served as Imperial governor. In 1872, he relocated to Tokyo, where he died in 1913. He received the title of shishaku (viscount) in the kazoku peerage system.

See also
List of Han

References
The content of this article was largely derived from that of the corresponding article on Japanese Wikipedia.

External links
 "Itoigawa" at Edo 300

Notes

Domains of Japan
History of Niigata Prefecture
Echigo Province
Hokuriku region
Arima clan
Fukui-Matsudaira clan
Honda clan
Itoigawa, Niigata